Ronald Latham (1929-1973) was a male boxer who competed for England.

Boxing career
He represented England and won a gold medal in the 60 kg division at the 1950 British Empire Games in Auckland, New Zealand.

He was part of Hickleton Main Boxing Club and won the 63rd ABA National Championship lightweight title.

Personal life
He was a blacksmith by trade at the Hickleton Main Colliery.

References

1929 births
1973 deaths
English male boxers
Boxers at the 1950 British Empire Games
Commonwealth Games medallists in boxing
Commonwealth Games gold medallists for England
Lightweight boxers
Medallists at the 1950 British Empire Games